Lasham Airfield  is an aerodrome located  north-west of Alton in Hampshire, England, in the village of Lasham.

It was built in 1942 and was a Royal Air Force Station during the Second World War, many significant operations being flown from it. The RAF ceased operations at Lasham in 1948, but an aircraft company, General Aircraft Ltd, continued to fly from the airfield. From 1951 the main activity at Lasham airfield became recreational gliding.

The airfield is now owned by the largest British gliding club, also one of the world's largest, Lasham Gliding Society (LGS). It is also the location for 2Excel Engineering Ltd., a company that maintains large jet aircraft.

Over-flying aircraft are requested to not fly below  QNH. The airfield frequency is 131.03 MHz.

Military history 
The airfield was constructed in 1942. Initial operations (from November that year) were by 38 Wing, Army Co-operation Command.

Maps of the area before and after the airfield was constructed are displayed in the main corridor of the clubhouse of Lasham Gliding Society on the North side of the airfield off Avenue Road. Also displayed are photographs and other details of aircraft and personnel of the squadrons that flew from Lasham and are listed below.

In mid-1943, the airfield was transferred to RAF Fighter Command. Squadrons equipped with Hawker Hurricanes, Hawker Typhoons and Supermarine Spitfires operated from Lasham. Later in 1943, it became a base for the bombers of No. 2 Group RAF, part of the RAF Second Tactical Air Force. The squadrons of 2 Group used the de Havilland Mosquito and North American B-25 Mitchell.

Squadrons based at Lasham during the war
(apart from one- or two-night stays)

Units

The following units were here at some point:

The accuracy was such that the incriminating records were burnt. There was loss of life amongst the Dutch and German staff, but there were few civilian casualties in the nearby streets.

On the nights preceding and following D-Day, the Mosquitos of 305 and 613 squadrons carried out low level attacks on enemy supply lines and armoured positions in Normandy to assist the allied landing forces.
The airfield ceased to be an operational Royal Air Force station in 1948, though General Aircraft Ltd continued testing military gliders there. On 14 September 2006, a memorial at the entrance was dedicated to those who served at Lasham between 1942 and 1948.

In 1952, future world champion Mike Hawthorn occasionally used its perimeter track to test his Cooper-Bristol Formula Two car, as did others.

In the 1960s the Space Department of the Royal Aircraft Establishment with its HQ at Farnborough, sited a number of satellite tracking and receiving dish aerials on the south side of Lasham airfield, one enclosed in a large white dome. These have now been removed, as have most of the buildings dating from World War II.

Gliding

Early days
In 1950 the Army Gliding Club was re-established by Major Tony Deane-Drummond, then an instructor at the Royal Military Academy Sandhurst. It operated at Odiham Airfield but after two accidents, the Commandant of Sandhurst ordered it to suspend operations. In early 1951 he ordered Major Deane-Drummond to restart the club at Lasham. In the meantime, the Surrey Gliding Club and Imperial College Gliding Club were both seeking a new home, because Redhill Aerodrome had many other users. The Surrey club and Imperial College therefore moved to Lasham in August 1951. As well as Tony Deane-Drummond, other notable instructors at that time included Ann Welch, Lorne Welch and Philip Wills. All of them went on to become British champions. A war-surplus barrage balloon winch was used for launches. Types flown included Slingsby T.21B trainer, Grunau Baby, and various other pre-war German sailplanes.

Lasham Gliding Society

Lasham Gliding Society (LGS) was established in 1958 to unify operations of the gliding clubs that had been operating since 1951. It later signed a long lease on the airfield from the Ministry of Defence.

232 gliders are based at Lasham which are used by 751 members, plus social members. The airfield is in constant use throughout the year and regularly hosts national and regional gliding championships. Oerlinghausen Airfield claims to be the world's largest gliding club with "around 25,000" glider launches annually whereas Lasham launched 25,750 gliders in the year to 31 October 2014. There are approximately 59,000 aircraft movements (departures and landings) annually (compared with Southampton Airport's 43,350).

In 1999, Lasham Gliding Society completed the purchase from the Ministry of Defence of the freehold to the airfield, making the final payment in 2001. It now owns all of the land within the fenced and gated area as well as the fields that form the undershoot area at each end of the main runway.

LGS's 90+ instructors train new pilots at all stages from ab initio through to competitive cross-country flying. The training fleet consists of the following types:
 ASK 13 (Five basic trainers)
 ASK 21 (Five glass-fibre trainers/Aerobatic Trainer)
 Duo Discus (advanced trainer)
 Duo Discus XLT (advanced trainer with turbo)
 Discus (three single-seaters)
 Grob G102 (three single-seaters)
 Scheibe SF-25 Falke motor glider

The club uses three Skylaunch winches, normally delivering launch heights of 1500 ft and over 2000 ft in strong winds. The club also operates five tugs:
 1 PA-25 Pawnee
 4 Robin DR400s
and can call on several privately owned tugs in busy periods.

There are 213 other gliders at the airfield operated by private owners and by affiliated gliding clubs: Imperial College Gliding Club, University of Surrey Gliding Club, Southampton University Gliding Club, The Crown Service Gliding Club and the IBM Gliding Club. Lasham Youth run a Saturday Evening gliding course during the summer months which is open to everyone, providing an environment where young members can fly with people of similar ages. The Gliding Heritage Centre has two separate hangars on the south side containing 42 historic gliders, many of which are in flying condition.

Derek Piggott was Chief Flying Instructor at Lasham during much of the period from 1953 to 1989. Ann Welch, Nicholas Goodhart, Ralph Hooper, Frank Irving and Peter Twiss were also members for many years.

Imperial College Gliding Club
Imperial College Gliding Club is the oldest, and one of the largest, university gliding clubs in the United Kingdom. Founded in 1930, the club was the second club to become affiliated to the British Gliding Association. The club started by building its own glider Payne I.C.1. It has for most of its life flown from Lasham Airfield in Hampshire after transferring from Redhill in 1951. It operates under the auspices of Lasham Gliding Society who provide its launching facilities and many of its instructors.The club maintains an archive website where details of the club's history since 1930 are kept. It has 93 student members. Its current captain is Antoine Aulnette. Its most notable member was Frank Irving

2Excel Engineering

Companies based at the south-west of the airfield have used the main runway since 1954 to bring in large jet aircraft for overhauls. In 1954 Dan-Air established a subsidiary, Dan-Air Engineering, at Lasham Airfield to service its own fleet and aircraft belonging to other operators.

Between 1972 and 1974 Lasham airfield regularly hosted six Douglas DC3 Dakotas owned by Roger Byron-Collins' Macedonian Aviation based at Southend airport for care and maintenance and resprays under arrangements with Dan-Air.  Regular visitors were DH104 Dove G-APZU (04511), Douglas Dakota G-AMPO (16437/33185), G-AMHJ (13468), G-AMPZ (16124/32872), G-AMRA (15290/26735), G-AMSV (16072/32820)

From the 1960s to 1980s, Lasham hosted a number of unusual aircraft – notably one of only two surviving Avro Yorks (G-ANTK in Dan-Air colours) – and was the resting home of aircraft from around the world which came to be scrapped, including most of the old Comet 4 fleet. Dan-Air ceased trading in 1992, and after a period of operation by FLS Aerospace, the facility was let by the society to aircraft maintenance company ATC Lasham Ltd.

On 2 October 2015, the holding company of ATC Lasham went into administration and closed its Southend branch with immediate effect. New owners of ATC Lasham Ltd, 2Excel Engineering Ltd, signed a new lease with the Society on 23 December 2015 and have continued to maintain large jet aircraft at Lasham.

The airfield occasionally provides storage for redundant aircraft. In 2008 these included aircraft from XL Airways UK, Futura International Airways, Zoom Airlines. Six bmibaby 737s arrived in 2012 when the airline closed. Several aircraft were parked at Lasham during the COVID-19 recession, including some from easyJet, TUI and Ryanair.

References

Citations

Bibliography

External links 
Lasham Gliding Society

RAF Lasham airfield at controltowers.co.uk

Earth stations in England
East Hampshire District
Sport in Hampshire
Gliding in England
Flying clubs
Gliderports in the United Kingdom
Science and technology in Hampshire
Space programme of the United Kingdom
Royal Air Force stations of World War II in the United Kingdom
1942 establishments in England